Mundrabilla is in a very sparsely populated area in the far south east of Western Australia. At the 2016 census, Mundrabilla had a population of 23, 32% male and 68% female. The time zone in use is UTC+08:45.

Mundrabilla Roadhouse
Mundrabilla Roadhouse was built by Roger and Pat Warren-Langford, who initially managed Mundrabilla Station.

Mundrabilla Station
Mundrabilla Station, the first sheep station in the Nullarbor region, was established by William Stuart McGill (a Scotsman) and Thomas and William Kennedy (two Irishmen) in 1872. Thomas Kennedy died in 1896.  McGill's first wife Annie Harkness (née Crawford) died in childbirth in 1879. Annie McGill and Thomas Kennedy are both buried on Mundrabilla Station.  McGill remarried Ellen Angel Fairweather of Adelaide in 1889.

Climate
Mundrabilla has a typical arid climate; however it is cooler in summer than much of the Australian desert due to its proximity to the ocean. Despite this, Mundrabilla Station still holds the record for the equal 6th-hottest temperature in Australia,  recorded on 3 January 1979.

Present day
Like other locations in the Nullarbor Plain area, the area consists of nothing more than a roadhouse, open 6:00am to 9:30pm each day. The roadhouse includes a small wildlife park with emus, camels and an aviary. Pastoral activities continue in the area.

Meteorite
The Mundrabilla meteorite, the largest meteorite found in Australia, weighing 12.4 tonnes, was found by geologists R.B. Wilson and A.M. Cooney during a geological survey at Mundrabilla in 1966, and forms one half of the "Mundrabilla Mass". The next largest fragment weighs 5.08 tonnes. In all, 22 tonnes of fragments have been recovered, spread over a 60 km range making it one of the largest meteorite sites in the world. The fragments fell to Earth at least one million years ago.

See also
 List of extreme temperatures in Australia

References

External links

Shire of Dundas – Towns of the Eyre Highway
Nullarbor Net – Mundrabilla including local information.

Towns in Western Australia
Shire of Dundas
Nullarbor Plain
1872 establishments in Australia
Eyre Highway
Hampton bioregion